S.C.I.F.I. World was a daytime programming schedule for the Sci Fi Channel that started on July 17, 2000 and ended on December 21, 2001. It was what replaced varied programming in favor for mini-marathons.

Format
Divided into five different segments in accordance with the days of the week, each day centred on a particular science fiction theme, which the marathons followed, airing from 10 AM to 4 PM. These themes were named in such a way that, when assembled, they formed an acronym of the channel's name.

Superhero Land, which, on Mondays focused on superheroes featuring marathons of such shows as Batman, The Bionic Woman, Wonder Woman, and The Incredible Hulk. The first marathon aired thereon was The Six Million Dollar Man.
Creature Land, which, on Tuesdays focused primarily on monsters, otherworldly, nonhumanoid or otherwise, that included marathons of such shows as Land of the Giants, Hercules: The Legendary Journeys, Earth 2, and SeaQuest DSV. The first marathon aired thereon was of The Incredible Hulk.
Intergalactic Land, which centred attention towards space-driven shows as Space: Above and Beyond, Star Trek, and Lost in Space. The first marathon aired thereon was of the original Battlestar Galactica. These shows were seen on Wednesdays.
Fantastic Land, which deviated from the usual science-fiction focus unto more fantasy-based shows like Night Gallery, Otherworld, and Darkroom. The first marathon aired thereon was of Quantum Leap. These shows could be seen on Thursdays.
Inhuman Land, akin to Creatureland's theme, every Friday focused on monsters but more along the lines of  a conspiratorial scope and concerned the humanoid kind as was depicted in an animation of Carl Kolchak trying to evade a werewolf in the shadowy alleys of Inhumanland. Shows aired included Dark Skies, Alien Nation, and Something is Out There. The first marathon aired thereon was of Manimal.

To reinforce this novelty, the programming schedule was advertised by way of animations depicting it as a theme-park which various science-fiction characters such as James T. Kirk, Duncan MacLeod, and RoboCop inhabited. Aside from this, graphic teasers, trivia, and on-air questions were aired to amuse and inform the viewer and promote the SciFi.com website.

List of S.C.I.F.I. World shows


Reception and influence
Despite criticisms made by viewers in favour of reverting to a more varied programming schedule, this format of airing marathons five times a week continues to this very day although, since then, S.C.I.F.I. World has ceased to be as is much of Sci Fi Channel's second-run programming.

See also
 Cartoon Quest
 The Animation Station

References

External links 
 Sci-Fi Channel Cancels Daily Star Trek Showings

2000 American television series debuts
2001 American television series endings
Television programming blocks in the United States
Syfy original programming